Laudrup is the last name of a family of football (soccer) players:
 Finn Laudrup, father of Michael and Brian, former Brøndby IF and Denmark national team.
 Michael Laudrup, former captain of the Denmark national team, former Juventus, Barcelona, Real Madrid and Ajax player among other clubs. Managed Denmark and various clubs.
 Brian Laudrup, former Denmark national team player, former Bayern München, AC Milan, Rangers, Chelsea and Ajax player among other clubs.
 Mads Laudrup, son of Michael, retired.
 Andreas Laudrup, son of Michael, retired.
 Nicolai Laudrup, son of Brian, retired.